The 2020 New Holland Canadian Junior Curling Championships was held from January 18 to 26 at the Langley Curling Centre and the George Preston Recreation Centre in Langley, British Columbia. The winners represented Canada at the 2020 World Junior Curling Championships in Krasnoyarsk, Russia.

In the women's final, Mackenzie Zacharias and her rink of Karlee Burgess, Emily Zacharias and Lauren Lenentine out of the Altona Curling Club in Altona, Manitoba capped off a perfect 11–0 record defeating Alberta's Abby Marks rink 10–3 including a score of four in the eighth end. It was a third championship win for Burgess as she also won the title in 2016 and 2018. In the men's final, Jacques Gauthier and his team of Jordan Peters, Brayden Payette and Zack Bilawka curling out of the Assiniboine Memorial Curling Club in Winnipeg, Manitoba defeated Newfoundland's Daniel Bruce rink 8–6 to make it an all Manitoba sweep in both the men's and women's events.

Men

Round-robin standings
Final round-robin standings

Championship Pool Standings
Final Championship Pool Standings

Playoffs

Semifinal
Saturday, January 25, 11:00 am

Final
Sunday, January 26, 2:00 pm

Women

Round-robin standings
Final round-robin standings

Championship Pool Standings
Final Championship Pool Standings

Tiebreakers
Friday, January 24, 2:00 pm

Saturday, January 25, 11:00 am

Playoffs

Semifinal
Saturday, January 25, 4:00 pm

Final
Sunday, January 26, 9:00 am

Qualification

The Alberta Junior Championships were held from January 1 - 5, 2020 at the Lloydminster Curling Club in Lloydminster, Alberta.

The championship was held in a round robin format, which qualified three teams for a championship round.

Pre-Playoff Results:

Playoff Results:
Men's Semifinal: Molberg 6 - Libbus 8
Men's Final: Jacques 6 - Libbus 5

Women's Semifinal: Marks 8 - Booth 4
Women's Final: Cinnamon 4 - Marks 6

The BC Junior Championships were held from December 28, 2019 - January 2, 2020 at the Victoria Curling Club in Victoria, British Columbia.

The championship was held in a round robin format, which qualified three teams for a championship round.

Pre-Playoff Results:

Playoff Results:
Men's Semifinal: Tao 11 - Colwell 6
Men's Final: Sato 9 - Tao 3

Women's Semifinal: Daniels 6 - Taylor 7
Women's Final: Buchy 8 - Taylor 6

The Telus Junior Provincial Championships were held from December 31, 2019 - January 5, 2020 at the Dauphin Recreation Centre in Dauphin, Manitoba.

The championship was held in a round robin format, which qualified four teams for a page-playoff championship round.

Pre-Playoff Results:

Playoff Results:
Men's A1 vs B1: Walter 2 - Gauthier 7
Men's A2 vs B2: Wiebe 6 - Hykaway 4
Men's Semifinal: Walter 9 - Wiebe 6
Men's Final: Gauthier 7 - Walter 8

Women's A1 vs B1: Zacharias 6 - Gray-Withers 3
Women's A2 vs B2: Bergman 5 - Lukowich 4
Women's Semifinal: Gray-Withers 9 - Bergman 1
Women's Final: Zacharias 10 - Gray-Withers 4

The New Brunswick Papa John's Pizza U21 Championships were held from December 27–30, 2019 at the Thistle St. Andrews Curling Club in Saint John, New Brunswick.

The championship was held in a modified triple-knockout format, which qualified three teams for a championship round.

Pre-Playoff Results:

Playoff Results:
Men's Semifinal: Nowlan 7 - Marin 8
Men's Final (N/A): Marin - Marin

Women's Semifinal: Comeau 5 - Forsythe 6
Women's Final (N/A): Forsythe - Forsythe

The Junior Provincials were held from December 27–29, 2019 at the Bally Haly Golf & Curling Club in St John's, Newfoundland and Labrador.

The men's championship was held in a double round robin format, the women's event was held in a best of five series between two rinks.

Pre-Playoff Results:

Playoff Results:
 No playoff round was required as Team Bruce had already beaten everybody twice.

The Best Western Junior Provincials were held from December 28–30, 2019 at the Hearst Community Curling Club in Hearst, Ontario.

The championship was held in a double round robin format, with the top two teams competing in the championship final.

Pre-Playoff Results:

Playoff Results:
 Men's Final: Horgan 7 - Vellinga 6
 Women's Tiebreaker: Brunton 5 - Croisier 4
 Women's Final: Deschene 4 - Brunton 9

The NWTCA Junior Curling Championships were held from December 13–15, 2019.

The men's championship was held in a best of five series between two rinks, the women's event was held in a double round robin format.

Results:

The AMJ Campbell U21 Championships were held from December 27–31, 2019 at the Lakeshore Curling Club in Lower Sackville, Nova Scotia.

The championship was held in a modified triple-knockout format, which qualified three teams for a championship round.

Pre-Playoff Results:

Playoff Results:
Men's Semifinal: Loewen 9 - Young 6
Men's Final: Weagle 10 - Loewen 6

No women's playoff was required as Team Stevens won all three qualifying events.

Men's Team: No men's team declared
Women's Team: Sadie Pinksen (Iqaluit)

The Ontario U-21 Curling Championships were held from December 27–30, 2019 at the Guelph Curling Club in Guelph.

The championship was held in a round robin, which qualified the top three teams for a championship round.

Pre-Playoff Results:

Playoff Results:
Men's Semifinal: McNamara 7 - Mooibroek 6
Men's Final: Purdy 8 - McNamara 7

Women's Tiebreaker: Warriner 6 - Steele 4
Women's Semifinal: Deschenes 8 - Warriner 4
Women's Final: Sutherland 9 - Deschenes 8

The Pepsi PEI Provincial Junior Curling Championships were held from December 27–29, 2019 at the Crapaud Community Curling Club in Crapaud, Prince Edward Island.

The championship was held in a modified triple-knockout format, which qualified three teams for a championship round.

Pre-Playoff Results:

Playoff Results:
 No men's playoff was required as Team Smith won all three qualifying events.

Women's Semifinal: MacLean 3 - Ferguson 8
Women's Final (N/A): Ferguson - Ferguson

The Quebec Performance Brush U21 Provincials were held from January 6–8, 2020 at the Club de curling Rivière-du-Loup in Rivière-du-Loup, Quebec.

The men's championship was held in a round robin format, the women's event was held in a best of five series between two rinks.

Pre-Playoff Results:

Playoff Results:
Men's Semifinal: Adam 6 - Cheal 7
Men's Final: Patry 4 - Cheal 7

The Junior Provincials were held from December 27, 2019 – January 1, 2020 at the Sutherland Curling Club in Saskatoon, Saskatchewan.

The championship was held in a round robin format, which qualified four teams for a page-playoff championship round.

Pre-Playoff Results:

Playoff Results:
Men's Tiebreaker 1: Steckler 11 - Bryden 2
Men's Tiebreaker 2: Bernath 9 - Steckler 5
Men's 1v2: Kleiter 9 - Pomedli 0
Men's 3v4: Sutherland 4 - Bernath 6
Men's Semifinal: Pomedli 6 - Bernath 7
Men's Final: Kleiter 7 - Bernath 6

Women's 1v2: Ackerman 4 - Thevenot 6
Women's 3v4: Kleiter 7 - Englot 8
Women's Semifinal: Ackerman 11 - Englot 6
Women's Final: Thevenot 7 - Ackerman 5

Men's Team: No men's team declared
Women's Team: Bayly Scoffin (Whitehorse)

References

External links
Official website

Junior Championships
Curling in British Columbia
Canadian Junior Curling Championships
2020 in British Columbia
January 2020 sports events in Canada
Langley, British Columbia (district municipality)